Polluelos de Aibonito was a Puerto Rican professional basketball team of the Baloncesto Superior Nacional based in Aibonito, Puerto Rico. They won their only national championship in 1986, defeating the 1985 champions Atleticos de San German, 4 games to 3, helped by stars Willie Meléndez, Angel Santiago, Rolando Frazer and Enrique Aponte, among others.

They returned to the BSN finals in 1987 but lost, also in seven games, to the Titanes de Morovis. The Polluelos franchise folded in 2002 after facing financial trouble.

Notable players

  Ángel Santiago
  Enrique Aponte
  Willie Meléndez
  Rolando Frazer
  Litterial Green
  Marcus Liberty
  Ed Horton
  Bob McCann
  Franklin Western
  Askia Jones

References

BSN teams